Sudarsanam is one of the Indian names:

 D. Sudarsanam was an Indian politician and Member of the Legislative Assembly of Tamil Nadu.
 Maddi Sudarsanam was an Indian Parliamentarian.

Masculine given names